The Ekalavya Award is given by the Government of Karnataka for outstanding performance in sports. The award was established in 1993.

Recipients of the Ekalavya Award 
 
 B Hariprasad  || 2022 (Volleyball)
|- 

Civil awards and decorations of Karnataka